Sujata Sadan is a theatre auditorium in Kolkata, West Bengal.  The theatre auditorium is located at 107 Harish Mukherjee Road, Kolkata 700026. Bengali theatre group like Swapnasandhani regularly perform in this auditorium.

Theatre
The theatre was named after Sujata Devi. The theatre is not as popular as other theatres in Kolkata like Sisir Mancha, Girish Mancha, Academy of fine arts. The one floor auditorium is comparatively small in size. But, it is said, the auditorium is very good for Intimate theatre.

Selected plays
Here a list of selected plays staged in Sujata Sadan.

Swapnasandhani plays

Ajke Aamar Chhuti
Bhalo Rakshosher Golpo
Bhoy
Birpurush
Bankubabur Bandhu
Dakghor
Darjiparar Marjinara
Hargaj
Malyadan

Other theatre groups
Aandhare ekla by Chetana.
Pragoitihasik by Gotraheen (Dum Dum)
Katha Manobi by Niva Arts.
Aadim Aranya by Gandeeb Natyam.

References

Bengali theatre
Bengali culture
Theatre in Kolkata
Performing arts in India
Theatres in Kolkata
Auditoriums in Kolkata